Bismuthinite is a mineral consisting of bismuth sulfide (Bi2S3).  It is an important ore for bismuth.  The crystals are steel-grey to off-white with a metallic luster. It is soft enough to be scratched with a fingernail and rather dense.

Bismuthinite forms a series with the lead, copper, bismuth mineral aikinite (PbCuBiS3).

It occurs in hydrothermal veins with tourmaline-bearing copper veins associated with granite, in some high temperature gold veins, and in recent volcanic exhalation deposits. Associated minerals include native bismuth, aikinite, arsenopyrite, stannite, galena, pyrite, chalcopyrite, tourmaline, wolframite, cassiterite and quartz.

It was first reported in 1832 from the mines of Potosí, Bolivia.

References

Further reading

Bismuth minerals
Sulfide minerals
Orthorhombic minerals
Minerals in space group 62